The Vélodrome Caisse Populaire de Dieppe was a 250-meter bicycle racing track located in Dieppe, New Brunswick, Canada, which opened in July 2001. It was the National Cycling Centre for Atlantic Canada. The track was found to be beyond repair when inspected in spring 2018 and it was subsequently demolished.

In 2006 and 2007, it was the host for the Tim Hortons National Track Championships.

References

Velodromes in Canada
Sport in Dieppe, New Brunswick
Sports venues in New Brunswick
Sports venues completed in 2001
2001 establishments in New Brunswick